Doreen Colondres is a Puerto Rican chef and food writer, who is the author of La Cocina No Muerde (The Kitchen Doesn't Bite). She is a sommelier, television presenter and specialist in Hispanic cuisine.

Biography 
Born in Puerto Rico, Colondres' grandfather was a professional chef. She has a BA in Business Administration and Marketing from the Universidad del Sagrado Corazón, and has studied at culinary schools in New York, California, and Florida. In 2014 she became a brand ambassador for Bumble Bee Seafoods, one of the largest seafood companies in the USA.

Colondres' first book, La Cocina No Muerde (The Kitchen Doesn't Bite), was published by Random Penguin House in June 2015, and became an Amazon bestseller. She worked on the Univisión show Despierta América, and hosted segments on cooking shows for Fox Life and Utilísima, for five years in 16 countries. As of 2022, she had been the food and wine editor of Siempre Mujer for six years, and has columns in more than 25 magazines around the world. She has performed cooking shows in the United States to raise awareness of obesity and diabetes. In 2019 she opened a wine school in Raleigh, North Carolina.

References

External links 

 Recipe list: El Correo del Golfo

Living people
Year of birth missing (living people)
Puerto Rican chefs
Sommeliers
Puerto Rican women writers
Universidad del Sagrado Corazón alumni